Otmar Oliva (born 19 February 1952) is a Czech sculptor and political prisoner. He specializes in the creation of liturgical objects and the arrangement of sacral buildings.

Biography
Oliva was born on 19 February 1952 in Olomouc-Hodolany. His mother was a political prisoner and his father was a war veteran. In 1967–1972, he studied sculpture at the Secondary School of Applied Arts in Uherské Hradiště and in 1972–1978, he studied sculpture at Academy of Fine Arts, Prague. He was actively involved in dissent and issuing and distributing samizdat documents of Charter 77. He was arrested in 1979 and became a political prisoner for 20 months.

After returning from prison in 1981, he got married. Since 1985, he was living and creating art in Velehrad. He created many sculptures of a predominantly sacred nature, and specialised himself mainly in the decoration of bells. He remained active in dissent. After the Velvet Revolution, he continued his artistic creation in his studio in Velehrad, where he also casts his sculptures. His masterpiece is the decoration of the papal Redemptoris Mater Chapel in Vatican City in 1994.

Work
Oliva decorated many objects with liturgical ornaments. His notable works include:
Redemptoris Mater Chapel in Vatican City
Church of Our Lady Mother of the Church in Maribor, Slovenia
Basilica in Velehrad
Svatá Hora in Příbram
Church of Our Lady of Victory in Karmelitská Street in Prague 1

References

External links

1952 births
Living people
Artists from Olomouc
Czech sculptors